Agnes Brand Leahy (August 18, 1893 – March 31, 1934) was an American screenwriter active in the 1920s and early 1930s.

Biography
Born Agnes Laura Brand in Portland, Oregon, and raised in Washington state, she married Fred Leahy in Seattle in 1913. The pair seems to have relocated to Southern California soon after and secured jobs at Paramount—she as a stenographer and he as a production manager.

Eventually Brand Leahy worked her way up the ranks, first moving into editing work and ultimately becoming a scenarist at the studio. Census records indicate that she may have also worked as an assistant director, although she is not credited as such.

Over the course of her career, she worked with filmmakers like Dorothy Arzner, Joseph L. Mankiewicz, and Frank R. Strayer. Her best-known films include Get Your Man, Red Hair, and The Night of June 13.

After a prolonged illness and leave from Paramount, Leahy died at the age of 40 at a sanitarium near San Francisco. The pair had no children.

Selected filmography
 Cap'n Jericho (1933)
 Lone Cowboy (1933)
 Pick-Up (1933)
 Evenings for Sale (1932)
 The Night of June 13 (1932)
 Forgotten Commandments (1932)
 Sky Bride (1932)
 No One Man (1932)
 The Beloved Bachelor (1931)
 Caught (1931)
 Fighting Caravans (1931)
 The Spoilers (1930)
 Only the Brave (1930)
 Stairs of Sand (1929)
 Moran of the Marines (1928)
 Red Hair (1928)
 Get Your Man (1927)
 Go Straight (1925)

References

1893 births
1934 deaths
American women screenwriters
Writers from Portland, Oregon
Screenwriters from Oregon
20th-century American women writers
20th-century American screenwriters